Rostislav Ivanovich Yankovsky (5 February 1930 – 26 June 2016) was a Belarusian actor. He was born in Odessa on 5 February 1930, studied in Leninabad and debuted in the Tajik theatre in 1951. Since 1957, he worked in the Minsk Drama Theatre. Yankovsky was named a People's Artist of the USSR in 1978. He is the older brother of the more famous Oleg Yankovsky. His son Igor Yankovsky is also an actor. In 1994 he became the Chairman of the Minsk International Film Festival Listapad.

He died in Minsk on 26 June 2016 in Minsk, Belarus, aged 86.

Filmography

Honours and awards
Belarus
 Order of Francisc Skorina (2000)
 Skorina Medal (1995)
 State Prize of the Republic of Belarus (1998)
 Honorary Citizen of the Hero City of Minsk (2000)
 Award "For Spiritual Revival"  (2003)
 Award Theatre Forum "Golden Knight"  (For outstanding contribution to the performing arts) (2005)

Soviet Union
 Order of the Badge of Honour (1967)
 Jubilee Medal "In Commemoration of the 100th Anniversary since the Birth of Vladimir Il'ich Lenin" (1970)
 Order of the Red Banner of Labour (1971)
 Order of Friendship of Peoples (1991)
 Honoured Artist of the Byelorussian SSR (1963)
 People's Artist of the Byelorussian SSR (1967)
 People's Artist of the USSR (1978)

Russia
 Pushkin Medal (2007)* International Academy of Theatre

References

External links 
 

1930 births
2016 deaths
Actors from Odesa
Soviet male film actors
Soviet male stage actors
Belarusian male film actors
Belarusian male stage actors
Russian male film actors
20th-century Belarusian male actors
Belarusian people of Polish descent
20th-century Polish nobility
Recipients of the Order of Francysk Skaryna
Recipients of the Order of Friendship of Peoples
People's Artists of the USSR
Recipients of the Medal of Pushkin
Actors from Minsk